Xi Serpentis, Latinized from ξ Serpentis, is a triple star system in the Serpens Cauda (tail) section of the equatorial constellation Serpens. Based upon an annual parallax shift of 30.98 mas as seen from Earth, it is located 105.3 light years from the Sun. The star system is visible to the naked eye with a base apparent visual magnitude of +3.54.

The inner pair form a single-lined spectroscopic binary with an orbital period of 2.29 days following a circular orbit with an eccentricity of 0.00. The primary, component Aa, has a visual magnitude of 3.54. This indicates it is a chemically peculiar Ap star with an abnormal abundance of strontium. The primary has around double the mass of the Sun, while its close companion, component Ab, has only 18% of the Sun's mass.

The third member, component B, is a magnitude 13.0 common proper motion companion. As of 2012, it was located at an angular separation of 24 arc seconds along a position angle of 78° from the inner pair. It has about 27% of the Sun's mass and an estimated orbital period of 14,763 years.

Name
In Chinese, Tiān Shì Zuǒ Yuán, meaning Left Wall of Heavenly Market Enclosure, refers to an asterism which represents eleven old states (and region) in China and which marks the left borderline of the enclosure, consisting of ξ Serpentis, δ Herculis, λ Herculis, μ Herculis, ο Herculis, 112 Herculis, ζ Aquilae, η Serpentis, θ1 Serpentis, ν Ophiuchi and η Ophiuchi.

References

F-type giants
Triple star systems
Spectroscopic binaries
Serpentis, Xi
Serpens (constellation)
Durchmusterung objects
Serpentis, 55
159876
086263
6561